This is a list of harmonic analysis topics. See also list of Fourier analysis topics and list of Fourier-related transforms, which are more directed towards the classical Fourier series and Fourier transform of mathematical analysis, mathematical physics and engineering.

Fourier analysis

Fourier series

Periodic function
Trigonometric function
Trigonometric polynomial
Exponential sum
Dirichlet kernel
Fejér kernel
Gibbs phenomenon
Parseval's identity
Parseval's theorem
Weyl differintegral
Generalized Fourier series
Orthogonal functions
Orthogonal polynomials
Empirical orthogonal functions
Set of uniqueness

Fourier transform

Continuous Fourier transform
Fourier inversion theorem
Plancherel's theorem
Convolution
Convolution theorem
Positive-definite function
Poisson summation formula
Paley-Wiener theorem
Sobolev space
Time–frequency representation
Quantum Fourier transform

Topological groups

Topological abelian group
Haar measure
Discrete Fourier transform
Dirichlet character
Amenable group
Von Neumann's conjecture
Pontryagin duality
Kronecker's theorem on diophantine approximation
Almost periodic function
Bohr compactification
Wiener's tauberian theorem

Representation theory

Representation of a Lie group
Unitary representation
Irreducible representation
Harish-Chandra character
Restricted representation
Induced representation
Peter–Weyl theorem
Spherical harmonic
Casimir operator
Hecke operator
Stone–von Neumann theorem
Discrete series representation
Tempered representation
Langlands program

Fast Fourier transform

Bluestein's FFT algorithm
Cooley–Tukey FFT algorithm
Rader's FFT algorithm
Number-theoretic transform
Irrational base discrete weighted transform

Analysis of unevenly spaced data
 Least-squares spectral analysis

Applications

FFT multiplication
Spectral method
Fourier transform spectroscopy
Signal analysis
Analytic signal
Welch method

Harmonic analysis
 
Harmonic analysis
Harmonic analysis